Balbriggan RFC is an Irish rugby team based at Bowhill, Balrothery just outside of Balbriggan town. They are a junior club and are currently playing in Division 2A of the Leinster League. The club colours are green and white. The club's women's team is currently in the Leinster League Division 2 The current president is Caroline McFadden 2019-2021 and the vice president is Leigh O'Toole 2019-2021. The club also has youths boys and girls teams as well as men's, women's, minis and special needs teams. In 2020 the club finally opened the long anticipated clubhouse. George Thomas Hamlet was a former president of the club who was also president of the IRFU and played rugby for Ireland on 29 occasions. In 1928 Balbriggan won the Leinster Towns Cup defeating Athy.

See also
 Balbriggan

External links
 Balbriggan RFC

Irish rugby union teams
Rugby clubs established in 1925
Rugby union clubs in Fingal